Listed below are the dates and results for the 2002 FIFA World Cup qualification rounds for (Africa).

The Confederation of African Football was allocated five qualifying berths for the 2002 FIFA World Cup. 51 teams entered the qualification process.

Burundi withdrew before the draw was made while Niger chose not to participate.

Guinea was excluded from the competition during the second round for government interference with its national association, resulting in their results obtained in second round annulled.

Africa's five automatic qualifying berths were taken by Cameroon, Senegal, Tunisia, South Africa, and Nigeria.

Tournament structure

There were two rounds of play:
 First Round: The 50 teams were divided into 5 pools of 10 teams each. In each pool, the 10 teams were paired up to play knockout matches on a home-and-away basis. The winners advanced to the Second Round.
 Second Round''': The 25 teams were divided into 5 groups of 5 teams each. The teams played against each other on a home-and-away basis. The group winners qualified.

First round

Pool A 

|}

Pool B 

|}

Pool C 

|}

Pool D 

|}

Pool E 

|}

Second round

Group A

Group B

Group C

Group D

Group E 

1 Guinea were disqualified on 19 March 2001 after being suspended by FIFA on 2 March due to financial irregularities and the Guinean sports minister's failure to meet a third and final FIFA deadline to reinstate the elected Guinean FA executive. Their match results were annulled.

Qualified teams
The following five teams from CAF qualified for the final tournament.

1 Bold indicates champions for that year. Italic indicates hosts for that year.

Goalscorers
There were 379 goals scored in 145 matches, for an average of 2.61 goals per match.
11 goals

 Ibrahima Bakayoko

8 goals

 El Hadji Diouf

6 goals

 Akwá
 Patrick Mboma
 Zoubeir Baya

5 goals

 Ngidi Yemweni
 Ziad Jaziri
 Ali Zitouni
 Peter Ndlovu

4 goals

 Abdeljalil Hadda
 Razundara Tjikuzu
 Victor Agali
 Nwankwo Kanu
 Shaun Bartlett
 Imed Mhedhebi

3 goals

 Mamadou Zongo
 Marc-Vivien Foé
 Samuel Eto'o
 Jason Mayélé
 Mohamed Barakat
 Abdul-Hamid Bassiouny
 Tarek El-Said
 Mohamed Farouk
 Charles Amoah
 Pascal Feindouno
 Abdul Kader Keïta
 Kelvin Sebwe
 Harry Randrianaivo
 James Moga
 Chaswe Nsofwa

2 goals

 Ali Meçabih
 Brahim Ouahid
 Rafik Saïfi
 Abdelhafid Tasfaout
 Bodunha
 Isaac Boelua Lokuli
 Paulão
 Bernard Tchoutang
 Shabani Nonda
 Walter Bakouma
 Abdel Sattar Sabry
 Mido
 Samuel Kuffour
 Souleymane Youla
 Fadel Keïta
 George Weah
 Christopher Wreh
 Khaled Elfallah
 Mutaz Kablan
 Jehad Muntasser
 Daniel Chitsulo
 Brehima Traoré
 Abdelfattah El Khattari
 Tico-Tico
 Benedict Akwuegbu
 Tijani Babangida
 Jay-Jay Okocha
 Yakubu
 Moussa N'Diaye
 Pape Thiaw
 Chernor Mansaray
 Sidique Mansaray
 Delron Buckley
 Khalid Bakhit
 Mujahid Ahmed
 Koffi Kossi
 Moustapha Salifou
 Khaled Badra
 Rotson Kilambe
 Charles Lota
 Harry Milanzi
 Jones Mwewa

1 goal

 Fares Aouni
 Djamel Belmadi
 Yacine Bezzaz
 Isâad Bourahli
 Fadel Settara
 Victor Covilhã
 Felipe Cata Edson
 Sebastião Gilberto
 Joni
 Quinzinho
 Hélder Vicente
 Zico
 Jonas Okétola
 Oumar Barro
 Moumouni Dagano
 Romeo Kambou
 Brahima Korbeogo
 Alain Nana
 Amadou Touré
 Harouna Traoré
 Narcisse Yaméogo
 Patrice Abanda
 Robert Jama Mba
 Lauren
 Pius Ndiefi
 Salomon Olembé
 Luciano Djim
 Mawa Inunu
 Papy Okitankoy Kimoto
 Kanika Matondo
 Michél Mazingu-Dinzey
 Kanku Mulekelayi
 Lwata Mpia
 Bolombo Tokala
 Christ Bongo
 Modeste Eta
 Ulrich Lepaye
 Edson Minga
 Bedel Moyimbouabeka
 George Ngoma Nanitelamio
 Jean-Silvestre N'Keoua

 Mahad Khaireh
 Hared Robleh
 Abdel-Zaher El-Saqqa
 Mohamed Emara
 Samir Kamouna
 Ibrahim Said
 Walid Salah Abdel Latif
 Mohamed Salah Abo Greisha
 Remo Eyoma
 Casiano Mba
 Anteneh Alameraw
 Sentayehu Getachew
 Daniel Cousin
 Daniel Addo
 Ishmael Addo
 Augustine Ahinful
 Charles Akonnor
 Kwame Ayew
 Isaac Boakye
 Emmanuel Duah
 Emmanuel Osei Kuffour
 Yaw Preko
 Titi Camara
 Pablo Thiam
 Ghislain Akassou
 Tchiressoua Guel
 Bonaventure Kalou
 Kandia Traoré
 Gilles Yapi Yapo
 Zéphirin Zoko
 Oliver Makor
 Zizi Roberts
 Frank Seator
 Musa Shannon
 Ahmed Al Masli
 Faisal Bushaala
 Rajab Elharbi
 Khalifa Khalifa
 Khaled Mhemed
 Ruphin Menakely
 Jean-Yves Randriamarozaka
 Etienne Rasoanaivo
 Nathalie Suiverstin
 Patrick Mabedi
 John Maduka
 Jones Nkhwazi
 Dereck Somanje
 Yaya Dissa
 Salem Ould Ely
 Jean-Sebastien Bax
 Jacques-Désiré Périatambée
 Gharib Amzine
 Rachid Benmahmoud
 Bouchaib El Moubarki
 Mustapha Hadji
 Rachid Rokki
 Erastus Gariseb
 Patrick Mkontwana
 Eliphas Shivute
 Julius Aghahowa
 Jonathan Akpoborie
 Garba Lawal
 Hassan Mili
 Julien Nsengiyumva
 Amilcar Ramos
 Celso Pontes
 Cheikh Ba
 Henri Camara
 Pape Seydou Diop
 Khalilou Fadiga
 Philip Zialor
 Mahmadu Alphajor Bah
 Abu Kanu
 Bradley August
 Matthew Booth
 Phil Masinga
 Benni McCarthy
 Siyabonga Nomvethe
 Jabu Pule
 Sibusiso Zuma
 Faroug Jabra
 Edward Jildo 
 Khalid Ahmed Elmustafa
 Siza Dlamini
 Ally Abubakari
 John Lungu
 Eric Akoto
 Alfa Potowabawi
 Komlan Amewou
 Komlan Assignon
 Sherif Touré Coubageat
 Jérôme Doté
 Togbe Dovi-Akon
 Salam Kouko
 Zanzan Atte-Oudeyi
 Hassen Gabsi
 Kaies Ghodhbane
 Radhi Jaïdi
 Riadh Jelassi
 Maher Kanzari
 Jamil Kyambadde
 Hassan Mubiru
 Majid Musisi
 Abubaker Tabula
 Dadley Fichite
 Chalwe Kunda
 Dennis Lota
 Andrew Sinkala
 Elijah Tana
 Benjani Mwaruwani
 Luke Jukulile
 Edzai Kasinauyo
 Blessing Makunike
 Master Masiku
 Nqobizitha Ncube

1 own goal

 Patrick Ranaivoson (playing against Congo)
 Bilal Sidibé (playing against Tunisia)

References
 FIFA.com results
 Rsssf.com results

 
CAF
FIFA World Cup qualification (CAF)